Bai Yue (born 13 December 1992) is a Chinese professional racing cyclist, who last rode for UCI Women's Team . She is from Shanxi.

See also
 List of 2015 UCI Women's Teams and riders

References

External links

1992 births
Living people
Chinese female cyclists
Cyclists from Shanxi
21st-century Chinese women